Yorick Smythies (21 February 1917 – 1980) was a student and friend of Ludwig Wittgenstein known for his notes of the philosopher's lectures. He was also a friend of, and character inspiration for, the novelist (and philosopher) Iris Murdoch.

Life

Childhood 
Yorick Smythies was born on 21 February 1917 in Shanklin on the Isle of Wight where Yorick's maternal grandparents were living at the time. Yorick was the first child of Kate Marjorie "Joe" Smythies née Gouldsmith, (1892–1975) and Cmdr Bernard Edward Smythies DFC who had been born in 1886 in Dehradum, India. Bernard, the younger brother of E. A. Smythies and elder brother of Richard Dawkins' paternal grandmother Edith, was a decorated RAF pilot who was killed in a flying accident at North Weald Airfield on 17 June 1930.  As well as being survived by his wife, son, and brother, Bernard "Bunny" Smythies would be survived by his father Arthur Smythies (1847- 1934) and by his daughter, Yorick's younger sister. Yorick was educated at Harrow.

University 
Smythies began the Moral Sciences Tripos at King's College, Cambridge in 1935, graduating with a First in philosophy in 1939.

Smythies attended, and took detailed notes of, Max Newman's 1935 lecture course on logic. Smythies also attended Wittgenstein's lectures in the academic year 1935/36 but (Wittgenstein not normally allowing students to take them in class) his notes of those lectures are sketchy. 

Wittgenstein was absent from Cambridge academic life from the autumn of 1936.. He returned in early 1938 and Smythies began to take more detailed notes of his lectures from that year. And (although Smythies completed his formal studies  in 1939) he continued to do so through the academic year of 1939/1940 and took some further notes during a temporary return to Cambridge between late 1940 and early 1941. (Though Smythies attended lectures by Wittgenstein between 1945 and 1947, according to Volker A. Munz, he "seems to have made little or no notes" during this last period of Wittgenstein's professorship.)

Being one of the few students Wittgenstein allowed to take lecture notes (and, at times, the only one), his notes became key sources for the reconstruction of Wittgenstein's lectures. During his lifetime, some of Smythies' notes were incorporated into Lectures and Conversations on Aesthetics, Psychology and Religious Belief (1966) and Lectures on the Foundations of Mathematics (1976) both being works edited by others. Further notes of Wittgenstein's lectures taken by Smythies were published in 1988 as Lectures on Freedom of the Will. However, a large body of notes, mostly from the period 1938 to 1940, which Smythies called the Whewell's Court Lectures (after the location at Trinity College, Cambridge where Wittgenstein's lectures were held) were only published in 2017 under the editorship of Volker A. Munz and his assistant Bernhard Ritter.

Smythies also became a close friend to Wittgenstein. They conducted an intense written correspondence (most of it now thought lost). And Smythies was, with a few other former students, at Wittgenstein's bedside around the time of his death.

Although Smythies delivered talks to the Cambridge Moral Sciences Club, taught philosophy part-time at Oxford in 1944 (on the philosophy of George Berkeley) and for Advanced Student Summer Courses between 1955 and 1957 he never became a professional lecturer and worked mainly as a librarian (latterly at the department of social studies at the University of Oxford). And although he wrote philosophy of his own, some intended for publication, only a review of Bertrand Russell's History of Western Philosophy is known to have been published during his lifetime. Smythies' review of the History was, as Ray Monk records, particularly "scathing" (and one Russell kept a copy of).

Religion 
Like G.E.M. Anscombe, Smythies was a convert to Catholicism.

Mental Health 
Ray Monk's claim (repeated by Peter J. Conradi and Valerie Purton) that Smythies suffered from (paranoid) schizophrenia is disputed by Volker A. Munz. Neither Monk nor Munz offer any explanation for why Smythies might been thought to suffer from this condition, nor, accordingly, does Munz offer any alternative diagnosis. Conradi however identifies a "schizophrenic breakdown" as the cause of Yorick 'hiding behind trees' and "making strange utterances" and mentions time spent by him in a mental hospital. An explanation is offered by Yorick's first cousin, the neuropsychiatrist J. R. Smythies who, also disputing Monk's claims of schizophrenia, claimed that, prescribed amphetamines for depression, Yorick Smythies became dependent on them and subsequently developed a "wholly iatrogenic" chronic paranoid amphetamine psychosis.

Marriages 
Smythies married his first wife Diana Pollard (known as 'Polly') in 1944, in Oxford. Diana was the daughter of the British Intelligence officer Hugh Pollard and had, aged eighteen, accompanied her father in posing as tourists to 'camouflage' the covert flight from England that collected General Franco from his 'semi-banishment' in the Canary Islands and took him to Spanish Morocco in 1936. The marriage would end in divorce but Diana continued to live in North Oxford until her death in 2003.

In 1974 Smythies married his second wife, Margaret 'Peg' Smythies née Britton (the ex-wife of Barry Pink, a friend to both Wittgenstein and Yorick) by whom Yorick had already had a son Daniel in 1963.  Peg would survive Yorick and go on to marry another friend and former student of Wittgenstein, the philosopher Rush Rhees. Peg would also survive Rhees (who died in 1989) dying in May 2014 having lived latterly in Amberley, Gloucestershire, near Stroud.

Death 
Volker A. Munz, insists (contrary to the claims of Ray Monk) that "there were no tragic circumstances" surrounding Smythies death, reporting: "Having been afflicted with emphisema for about five years and knowing not to live much longer he died in 1980." Yorick is registered as dying late that year, in, or near, Chipping Norton.

In literature
Smythies was the basis for the character Hugo Belfounder in the novel Under the Net (1954) by Iris Murdoch. When Smythies died in 1980 Murdoch wrote the character's death into her novel The Philosopher's Pupil which she was then composing.

References

External links
 Yorick Smythies (1917–1980) by Volker A. Munz and Bernhard Ritter (Wittgenstein's Whewell's Court Lectures project)
 Front Matter (including the Preface and Editorial Introduction) to Wittgenstein's Whewell's Court Lectures: Cambridge, 1938–1941, From the Notes by Yorick Smythies, (2017) Volker A. Munz and Bernhard Ritter (ed.) 
 Lectures on Knowledge ⟨Easter Term 1938), Wittgenstein's Whewell's Court Lectures: Cambridge, 1938–1941, From the Notes by Yorick Smythies, (2017) Volker A. Munz and Bernhard Ritter (ed.) 
 Yorick Smythies' review of Russell's History

1917 births
1980 deaths
People educated at Harrow School
20th-century English philosophers
English librarians